The 1984 NCAA men's volleyball tournament was the 15th annual tournament to determine the national champion of NCAA men's collegiate volleyball. The tournament was played at Pauley Pavilion in Los Angeles, California during May 1984.

UCLA defeated Pepperdine in the final match, 3–1 (15–10, 15–13, 16–18, 15–7), to win their eleventh national title. This was a rematch of the previous year's final, also won by UCLA. The undefeated Bruins (38–0) were coached by Al Scates.

UCLA's Ricci Luyties was named the tournament's Most Outstanding Player. Luyties, along with six other players, comprised the All-tournament team.

Qualification
Until the creation of the NCAA Men's Division III Volleyball Championship in 2012, there was only a single national championship for men's volleyball. As such, all NCAA men's volleyball programs (whether from Division I, Division II, or Division III) were eligible. A total of 4 teams were invited to contest this championship.

Tournament bracket 
Site: Pauley Pavilion, Los Angeles, California

All tournament team 
Ricci Luyties, UCLA (Most outstanding player)
Doug Partie, UCLA
Asbjorn Volstad, UCLA
Roger Clark, UCLA
Jeff Stork, Pepperdine
Mike Fitzgerald, Pepperdine
Ric Lucas, George Mason

See also 
 NCAA Men's National Collegiate Volleyball Championship
 NCAA Division I Women's Volleyball Championship

References

1984
NCAA Men's Volleyball Championship
NCAA Men's Volleyball Championship
1984 in sports in California
May 1984 sports events in the United States
Volleyball in California